Raspailiidae is a family of sponges belonging to the order Axinellida.

Genera

Genera:
 Abilana Strand, 1928
 Acantheurypon Topsent, 1927
 Aulospongus Norman, 1878

References

Sponge families